Melodic Excursions is an album by American jazz saxophonist George Adams and pianist Don Pullen Quartet recorded in 1982 for the Dutch Timeless label.

Reception
The Allmusic review by Steve Loewy awarded the album 3½ stars stating "Both Pullen and Adams fans should be satisfied with this effort, as each performer shines. While the recording may sometimes lack the seriousness that some might prefer from these giants of the genre, it's clearly one of their best group efforts".

Track listing
All compositions by Don Pullen except as indicated
 "The Calling" – 6:36 
 "God Has Smiled on Me" (Traditional) – 3:23 
 "Kahji" – 6:00 
 "Playground Uptown and Downtown" (George Adams) – 4:50 
 "Decisions" – 6:50 
 "Reflexions Inward" (George Adams) – 4:24 
 "Resolutions of Conflicts" (George Adams) – 6:32 
Recorded at Soundtek Studios in New York City on June 6 & 9, 1982

Personnel
Don Pullen – piano
George Adams – tenor saxophone

References

Timeless Records albums
Don Pullen albums
George Adams (musician) albums
1982 albums